The following are characters from Disney's 1998 film Mulan, its 2004 sequel Mulan II, and its 2020 remake Mulan.

The Fa / Hua family 
In the 2020 live-action film, the Fa family name is changed to Hua (花) in English. Hua is the Mandarin pinyin romanization of the same word as Fa, which was based on Cantonese romanization.

Mulan

Fa Mulan is a young woman who is willing to give up her life to save her father. She enters the army as a man named Ping. She faces the worst enemy China's ever seen, the Hun leader Shan-Yu, who has an army willing to destroy anything in their path. She succeeds in fighting them and saves all of China single-handedly without any help. The Emperor of China awards her for her effort and the whole of China celebrate her return.

In the 2020 live-action film, as her surname is now Hua instead of Fa, Mulan assumed the pseudonym Hua Jun during her time in the army.

Fa Zhou
Fa Zhou is Mulan's father who is very strict and also a famed war veteran who got injured in war. At first glance he seems like he only cares about the honor of the family and that he is quick to frustration with Mulan. He first appears putting an incense stick on the hanging dish and praying to the honorable ancestors while Mulan is seeing the matchmaker. Nothing distracts him from his prayers, even when chickens go running around in the shrine to crazily devour the chicken feed. When Chi-Fu calls him from the Fa family for military duty, he puts down the cane, stands straight and accepts his assignment scroll, not caring about his old crippled body despite his limping and visible pain. Mulan worries that he is risking his life, especially after seeing him collapse after some sword exercises. When Mulan returns in a triumph of defeating Shan Yu, she gives him Shan Yu's sword with the blade wrapped in cloth and the crest of the emperor; the two gifts that honor the Fa Family. On receiving these gifts, he immediately puts them down and confesses that all he ever wanted was Mulan to be happy and safe, informing her that his greatest honor is having her as a daughter. He was voiced by Soon-Tek Oh.

In the 2020 live-action remake, he is portrayed by Tzi Ma.

Fa Li
Fa Li is Mulan's mother. She initially stays with the dresser waiting for Mulan to come. She is frustrated when her daughter's hair is messed with hay and sends her inside to have her bathed and cleaned up. She and all the dressers help her get dressed after the bath. After they have finished beautifying Mulan, she sends her to the impatient matchmaker who then gets enraged by Mulan's accidents. Fa Li consoles her after the matchmaker rejects her. During the rainy night, she weeps for her daughter who runs away with Khan the horse, and her husband Fa Zhou consoles her while watching over her at the same time. When Li Shang shows up in the middle of a conversation between Fa Li and Grandmother Fa about Mulan's war exploits and that she should've brought a man home, Fa Li is left stunned. According to her second film, the only other child she likes is Sha-Ron (a faux-Chinese version of the name Sharon), a little girl who wears a lavender outfit and ox-horns. She was voiced by Freda Foh Shen.

In the 2020 live-action film, she is portrayed by Rosalind Chao.

Grandmother Fa
Grandmother Fa is Mulan's grandmother. She is very easy-going and gives Mulan the most freedom. She also provides comic relief in the family. She is first seen holding a cage with Cri-Kee in it. She covers her eyes while crossing a road and demonstrates the ability to show how lucky this cricket is. After Fa Li and all the dressers have finished beautifying Mulan, Grandma Fa gives her a few items to make her look perfect (apple, pendant, jade necklace and Cri-Kee). She constantly encourages her to find a good husband. During the rainy night, she recognizes that her granddaughter has run away to join the army in her father's place, and she picks up a lantern and prays to the ancestors, awakening First Ancestor Fa. When Mulan returns home with Shan Yu's sword and the Emperor's crest, she comments that Mulan should have brought a man home and is shocked when Li Shang arrives, causing her to jokingly say to sign her up for the next war.  When Mulan asks Shang to stay for dinner, she asks him to stay forever. Mulan is shown to be fondly annoyed by this but Shang does agree to stay for dinner. In her second film, she plays a game in the house of Fa and brings in food for the perfect couple Mulan and Shang. Her speaking voice is provided by June Foray and her singing voice is provided by Marni Nixon. The character is absent in the live-action adaptation, being replaced by Hua Xiu.

First Ancestor Fa
First Ancestor Fa is the ghostly eldest member of the Fa family and acts as leader of the ancestors. He carries a staff with him. When he is summoned, he brings Mushu to life by saying the word "awaken". He usually stops the other ancestors from fighting and requests (what he thinks are) better plans such as summoning the Great Stone Dragon. When Mushu returns with Mulan, he gives him his job as a guardian again, though showing a frustrated face. At the beginning of his second film, he performs a trick using a smoke formation. He was voiced by George Takei.

Other Ancestors
Other Ancestors, members of the company including the farmer and his wife (a parody of the famous painting American Gothic), and the counter who is always fiddling with his abacus. Fa Deng is the only ancestor whose head is cut off, a result of Mushu's misguidance to him when he was a guardian. Many of these ancestors clamor about Mulan when she is away. Mary Kay Bergman did the voice of the female ancestors in the first film and in the second film, they are voiced by Tress MacNeille.

Hua Xiu
In Mulan (2020), Hua Xiu (portrayed by Xana Tang), is the sister of Hua Mulan and the second daughter of Hua Zhou and Hua Li. She is based on Mulan's younger brother from The Ballad of Mulan and Mulan's younger sister in the Ming dynasty play Mulan Joins the Army.

Chinese military

Li Shang

Captain/General Li Shang is a Chinese army captain. His speaking voice was provided by BD Wong in both titles, and his singing vocals were performed by Donny Osmond (in the Cantonese and Mandarin dubs, he is voiced in full by Jackie Chan). During his appointment in the first movie, Shang is a highly capable leader with a dedication to his cause to match, albeit at times being too "by-the-book" and putting his duty above his feelings, in contrast to Mulan. He is exceptionally handsome due to his dashing good looks, extremely feminine facial features and strong muscular fit physique. He is reserved and thoughtful, a more logical and calming influence to Mulan's adventurous personality. Shortly after his initial introduction in Mulan, Shang is appointed newly as an army captain by his father, who is a general. Later through the film, he becomes friends with Ping (who is Fa Mulan disguised as a man), after his life is saved. Shortly after, however, he finds out she is actually a woman, which is forbidden by the empire's law and punishable by death. Shang spares her life, and after helping her save the empire, he falls in love with her and joins her family for dinner.

In Mulan II, Shang is the main character instead of Mulan (who was the previous film's main protagonist), because he fell in love with her. The film begins with Shang proposing marriage to Mulan, to which she gladly agrees. He is promoted from captain to general by the emperor, and he and Mulan are directed by the emperor to escort his three daughters to a conflicting kingdom in hopes that an arranged marriage between them and the three princes of the opposing nation will bring peace. He and Mulan go through many conflicts around their relationship thanks to Mushu's meddling, and midway through the film, he is assumed dead after falling into a canyon with streaming river further down. Later, when it is revealed he is alive (with help from his gray-spotted white horse), Mushu and Cri-Kee saves the day by pretending to be the Golden Dragon of Unity and freeing the princesses from their vows.  Mulan and Shang get married, and later combines both families’ temples so that Mushu can remain as Mulan's guardian.

In Chinese naming convention, personal names in Chinese, unlike Western names, present the family/clan name first. This convention was followed in the first film; his family name was given to be Li and he was addressed as "Captain Li." In the second film, the convention was overlooked and Shang was used as his family name by mistake.

In video games, Shang appears in Kingdom Hearts II as a supporting character in the world Land of Dragons, having the same role in the story as in Mulan. He is also a playable character to unlock for a limited time in the video game Disney Magic Kingdoms.

In the 2020 live-action remake, the character of Li Shang was dropped in response to the Me Too movement, due to the nature of a military conscript having a relationship with a commanding officer. Instead, Li's role was fulfilled by two new characters: Commander Tung (portrayed by Donnie Yen), a mentor and teacher to Mulan who leads the Imperial Regiment; and Chen Honghui (portrayed by Yoson An), a confident and ambitious recruit in Tung's unit, as well as Mulan's most important ally and love interest.

Yao, Ling and Chien-Po

The army recruited Yao, Ling and Chien-Po to fight the Huns. Like other newly recruited soldiers, they lacked military skills before they were trained. However, they were harder to train than most. Even Mulan learned faster than they. Eventually, their training paid off and the trio were capable fighters. Even so, they still had trouble doing things right and were rather clumsy. They served largely as the comic relief, often involving slapstick humor that made them reminiscent of the Three Stooges. Eventually, despite some early conflict, the three extended an open hand to Mulan and became her "army buddies", though they, like the rest of the army, thought she was a man named Ping. As soldiers, they each had a different color uniform: green for Mulan, red for Yao, yellow for Ling and blue for Chien-Po. Unlike most other soldiers, Yao, Ling, and Chien-Po did not seem to think any less of her when they found out she was a woman, and even briefly tried to interfere when Shang was about to execute her. When they later met up, they even agreed to participate in her plan to stop the surviving Huns by disguising themselves as concubines. Somehow, they fooled the guards, though none of the three made a very attractive woman (especially Yao, as he kept his facial hair even in makeup).

In the second film, the three were given a more substantial role and are shown not to have changed since the first film. Reprised by the original voice actors (sans Wilder; Watanabe did his own singing), they had been to see the matchmaker that rejected Mulan in the first film, but she decided there could not be a match for any of them and threw them out. They were discouraged but felt better when Mulan and Li Shang came to recruit them for another mission. Shang claimed to the emperor that just the five of them would be enough protection for his three daughters. Although still as bumbling as ever, Shang knew that they were instrumental in their victory against the Huns, which they did not appear to have received the same credit for. They gladly joined the escort to get the emperor's daughters to the Qui Gong princes they are engaged to. Along the way, they develop feelings for the princesses, Yao with Mei, Ling with Ting-Ting, and Chien-Po with Su. They take the princesses to a carnival for some amusement. Eventually, all three princesses admit that their feeling is mutual, and do not want to marry the princes, despite their duty. Mulan, knowing this, leaves the trio with the princesses, and goes to offer herself to the royal family instead. However, the trio arrives with the princesses, as does Shang. Mushu pretends to be the Great Golden Dragon of Unity who commands that they are allowed to marry whoever they want, allowing them to be with Yao, Ling, and Chien-Po. Presumably, they did marry, though nothing was shown to indicate this.

Yao, Ling and Chien Po appear in the video game Kingdom Hearts II as a supporting character in the world Land of Dragons, having the same role in the story as in Mulan.

Yao
Yao is the self-appointed leader of the trio. His signature color is red in the first film and purple in the second film. An arrogant and short-tempered individual with a bit of a Napoleon complex, he is short, stocky and has a permanent black eye. In the first film, he enjoys picking on Mulan for fun at first but eventually becomes her friend. His clumsiness reveals, however, that he is not as powerful a man as he claims to be. He states that he wants a girl who will admire his strength and battle scars.

In the second film, he reveals a rewarding plaque that has a picture of himself on his chest and falls in love with Princess Mei, the emperor's middle daughter. She accepted the idea that "my duty is to my heart" and is the easiest to be won over. In his encounter, he puts the slipper back onto her foot and sets the table for her with oranges, meat buns and tea. He wanted to marry a girl who would be impressed with his looks and his fighting ability. Although such traits leave something to be desired, he managed to impress her, and when he wins a fight at a carnival and is given a prize, he chooses a stuffed panda bear with three black legs and one white leg and gives it to her.

In the 2020 live-action remake, he is portrayed by Chen Tang. His gruff characteristics are kept, but he is portrayed as being more jovial than his animated counterpart.

Ling
Ling is the group's middleman of medium height and very slim build. His signature color is yellow in the first film and blue in the second film. He is a friendly and enthusiastic man with a joke for every occasion. Though he teases Mulan at first, he, like the other two, becomes her friend. He and Yao occasionally have disagreements, but he grows to accept him as their leader. He was the one who coined the phrase "a girl worth fighting for."

In the second film, he falls in love with Princess Ting-Ting, the eldest princess. She is the most uptight princess, devoted to honor, and tries be a role model to her sisters. Ling, who wanted a girl who would laugh at his jokes (even knowing the chopstick nose trick that Ling believes to have invented), had to try harder than his partners to impress her. Unlike most people, Ting-Ting is amused by his puns, but would not laugh, claiming to dislike laughter, though the reason is that she thinks her snorting laugh is embarrassing. He begins to doubt himself. However, at the carnival, when some fireflies accidentally set off firecrackers that hit Ling, she cannot contain herself at his misfortune. She snorts, but Ling doesn't mind and thinks it's cute. At the end, they are able to get married because of Mushu.

In the 2020 live-action remake, he is portrayed by Jimmy Wong. He is depicted as being much friendlier and adept at quoting poetry.

Chien-Po
Chien-Po, or Po for short, is bald and by far the tallest and most obese of Mulan's friends. His signature color is blue in the first film and green in the second film. He is the calmest and most spiritual of the three, and his appearance seems to have been inspired by Buddhist imagery. He is rather naïve compared to his partners, and loves food more than anything, which is the main thing he considers when searching for a woman for he wishes for a wife that will be good at cooking and preparing food. He is very good-natured and would never do anything to upset anyone, making him the most ready to befriend Mulan. He also possesses great strength and can lift multiple people (or a massive stone statue) with ease.

In the second film, he falls in love with Princess Su, the youngest sister. The most childlike, she is easily swayed and is soon convinced of Mei's opinions. She loves food as much as Chien-Po, and when the group stops traveling for a while, she spends her time picking fruit from trees. Chien-Po discovers this, and the two of them bond easily. He even saves her when the carriage ends up falling in the water. At the carnival, they both order some dumplings, ginger, Ginsengs and soybeans.

In the 2020 live-action remake, he is portrayed by Doua Moua. He is just as rowdy as his comrades in this version, but still holds his love of food.

General Li
General Li was Li Shang's father and a high-ranking member of the Chinese army who was killed along with his elite troops in a battle against the Hun army while trying to protect a village. When his son and his battalion discover the aftermath along with what's left of the village, Chien-Po finds General Li's helmet and delivers to Shang as proof that his father is dead. Shang creates a makeshift shrine for his father using his sword and the helmet to honor him and Mulan leaves a doll, which Shan Yu found earlier and left behind in the village ruins, at the shrine to honor the villagers who were killed in the attack. He was voiced by James Shigeta.

Cricket
In Mulan (2020), Cricket (portrayed by Jun Yu) is a young hapless soldier that joins the ranks of the Chinese army and befriends Mulan, Yao, Ling, Chien-Po and Chen Honghui. Cricket explains that his parents named him as such so that he can bring good fortune to himself and those around him. Despite being clumsy and shy, he is shown to be very adept at using a bow and arrow. The character is most likely a reference to Cri-Kee from the animated film.

Animals/creatures

Mushu

Mushu is Fa Mulan's closest companion throughout the Mulan series. He is a scrawny, reddish-orange Chinese dragon with blue horns and a cheeky-chappy personality. He is voiced by Eddie Murphy in his first appearance and Mark Moseley (a professional Eddie Murphy impressionist) afterward.

At first, Mulan's companions were to be two reptilian creatures; the idea of the creatures being dragons had not been established. However, feeling that two sidekicks would overcrowd the story, the animators then decided on a two-headed dragon, though they were green and grotesque. After the animators decided on a single-headed dragon, they established Mushu's physical concept. For better use, the animators shrunk Mushu to a smaller size.

Around the time when the music of the film was to be created, the songwriters had written a piece for Mushu, for him to sing to assure Mulan that he will be there to help her. However, after Eddie Murphy came to voice the character, the character and his dynamic changed. Although the animators canceled the scene, the song was a favorite among the filmmakers.

Mushu was once a guardian spirit of Mulan's family, but he has been demoted to the unappreciated position of an incense burner and gong-ringer for the deceased Fa ancestors ever since he failed to protect a family member, a soldier named Fa Deng, resulting in the soldier's demise by decapitation. In contrast to Mulan, Mushu is in most situations more zany, impulsive, and enthusiastic.

He strives to be one of the family guardians again, but is content to help Mulan, even if he is the one who starts the trouble. He can also be selfish at times, but his heroism proves that he has a good heart. Mushu is very sensitive about his size, claiming to Mulan that his small stature was simply for her convenience rather than his default state. He also hates being mistaken for a lizard, insisting that he doesn't do "that tongue thing".

He has the body of a snake, the horns of an elk, the claws of an eagle, and the face of a camel, resembling a legendary dragon found in Chinese art around the time. He is able to survive more like a mythical creature than an animal; he endures being stomped on, being caught in explosions, and (literally) riding out an avalanche in the first movie. He can also understand other animals, as seen when he converses with Mulan's cricket Cri-kee and horse Khan.

At one point when he wants to disguise as a soldier riding a horse to get them out of the camp, he uses a giant panda as the soldier's steed after Khan, Mulan's horse, refused to help him and Cri-kee. Like many dragons, he is able to breathe fire, at first unsuccessfully, but masters it in time to stop Shan Yu's falcon, Hayabusa, from alerting the Huns to Li Shang's presence.

At the start of the film, Mushu does not make his official appearance until after Mulan runs away from home to serve in her elderly father Fa Zhou's place in a war against the deadly Hun army. Knowing that Mulan's exposure will lead to the disgrace of the Fa family, the spirits of the ancestors choose to send the Great Stone Dragon to retrieve her. For the task of awakening him, they send Mushu, who would rather go himself.

After several unsuccessful attempts, he eventually ends up accidentally destroying the dragon statue. In order to escape punishment from the ancestors, he pretends to be the Great Stone Dragon and secretly sets out to make Mulan a war hero. Mushu is extremely diligent and with the help of Cri-kee, helps Mulan defeat Shan-Yu, resulting in him being returned to the position of a guardian.

In the Kingdom Hearts video game series, Mushu appears in Kingdom Hearts and Kingdom Hearts: Chain of Memories as a character to summon by Sora, and returns in Kingdom Hearts II in the world Land of Dragons, having the same role in the story as in Mulan. He is also a playable character to unlock for a limited time in the video game Disney Magic Kingdoms.

Mushu does not appear in the 2020 live-action remake, but some of his role in the narrative were taken by a phoenix.

Mushu also appears in the Drawn to Animation show at Disney California Adventure Park's Disney Animation building and Disney's Hollywood Studios's The Magic of Disney Animation. He is also a meetable character in Adventureland at the parks alongside Mulan.

It is possible that it the name Mushu could be a shorter form of mushkhushshu, an unrelated yet similarly characterized, red snake-like, hybrid creature from Mesopotamian mythology. Another theory suggests that its name comes from the popular Chinese takeaway dish moo shu pork.

Cri-Kee
Cri-Kee is a cricket that was given to Mulan while getting her ready to meet the Matchmaker. He is first seen in possession of Grandmother Fa, who crosses a road while covering her eyes to demonstrate Cri-kee's ability; however, his actions lead the Matchmaker to reject Mulan. Afterward, Mulan releases Cri-kee, but he continues to follow her and later befriends Mushu before joining him on his mission to protect Mulan. During an ambush by the Huns, he and Mushu were nearly killed when the wagon that they're in catches fire and explodes and Cri-kee follows Mulan (who has picked up Mushu while fleeing). Mushu later rescues him from an avalanche that Mulan caused to wipe out the Huns. After Mulan is expelled from the army, Cri-kee finally confesses that he isn't a lucky cricket at all. Despite this, he and Mushu help Mulan stop Shan Yu and save the Emperor, leading Mushu to deem him a lucky bug after all. In the second film, he becomes an enemy to Mushu when he tries to break up Shang and Mulan to keep his job. Cri-kee does whatever he can to foil Mushu's plans and ensure that the duo stays together, even after Mushu causes an accident that results in the destruction of a carriage that Mulan and Shang are using to transport the Emperor's daughters. Later in a canyon, Cri-kee forces Mushu to tell the truth and later becomes friends with Mushu again at the end. He is voiced by Frank Welker.

Cri-Kee appears a playable character to unlock for a limited time in the video game Disney Magic Kingdoms.

Hayabusa 
Hayabusa is Shan Yu's pet saker falcon, who acts as his master's eyes and ears from a distance. At the end of the first film, his feathers are burned down by a fireball from Mushu to stop him from warning the Huns of Li Shang's presence, who then taunts him as "Mongolian barbeque" while Cri-kee laughs at him. When Mulan returns from rescuing the Emperor, he can briefly be seen being ridden by Mushu and Cri-kee. The two then leave Hayabusa behind to enact Mulan's plan. He isn't seen afterward.

In video games, Hayabusa appears in Kingdom Hearts II the boss battle against Shan Yu, where he can grab Sora, lift him into the air, and throw him. Hayabusa also appears as a non-player character in the video game Disney Magic Kingdoms, appearing only in one of Shan Yu's animated activities.

In the 2020 live-action film, Hayabusa is replaced by Xianniang (portrayed by Gong Li), a powerful sorceress allied with Bori Khan who can transform herself into a hawk. She is the secondary antagonist of the film, and challenges Mulan's decision to fight for a society that regards her as inferior because of her gender. Xianniang ultimately betrays Khan by revealing his plans to Mulan, allowing her to warn the army, and gives her life to save Mulan by taking an arrow meant for her.

Khan
Khan is Mulan's horse with a black coat and white markings on his face, belly and legs. He is portrayed as a very intelligent and confident horse. When he first saw Mushu, he tried to kill him with his hooves out of fear. In the first film, during the surprise ambush on the mountains, Mulan causes an avalanche killing many Huns. Khan risks his life to save Mulan and tries his best to run to safety before he almost falls to his death off the cliff. He also seems to be very close to Mulan but doesn't like Mushu so much. In the second film, he gets extremely angry at Mushu who tries to break Mulan and Shang up after his saddle is unbuckled and in one of his attempts, he injures him by stomping on him with his hooves as payback. Khan is voiced by Frank Welker.

Khan appears as a playeble character to unlock for a limited time in the video game Disney Magic Kingdoms.

He appears in the 2020 live-action remake as Black Wind.

Little Brother
Little Brother is Mulan's pet dog. He has a blue collar around his neck. Mulan often uses him to spread chicken feeds by hanging a bone in front of him, similar to the carrot on a stick trick. He is voiced by Chris Sanders in the first movie and Frank Welker in the second movie.

Shan Yu

A physically imposing and ruthless Hun chieftain and the general of the Huns who serves as the main antagonist of the film. He is voiced by Miguel Ferrer in Mulan. Shan Yu is the cruel leader of the Huns who is bent on conquering China, and with his Hun army, climbs over the Great Wall and invades the land to prove his "superiority" to the Emperor. He is the only Hun to have eyes with black scleras and orange irises. His name seems to be derived from the title of Chanyu, used by many Inner Asian nomad rulers prior to the establishment of the title of khagan.

Like the rest of his people, Shan Yu is trained in living off the earth, possessing heightened senses and a trained saker falcon named Hayabusa as his pet. His strength is demonstrated many times during the course of the film, such as easily breaking down a barricaded door or effortlessly slicing through a massive pillar with his sword, making him easily one of the strongest characters in the film (second perhaps only to Chien-Po). Ruthless and cold-hearted, Shan Yu kills without mercy or remorse and, on occasion, as a joke; for example, after freeing two captured Chinese scouts to carry a message to the Emperor, he then comments to an archer, "How many men does it take to deliver a message?" (The archer replies "one", nocking an arrow.) While clearly heartless to his foes, he is proud of his army, as shown at the beginning when he mocks a Chinese soldier who boasts that all of China knows he is coming (he even lights one of the signal fires with a burning banner) and when he flatly refused to avoid the Imperial troops and instead chose to take them head on, despite knowing that they were much better trained and equipped than his own men.

Sometime after General Li's recruits complete their training, Hayabusa acquires a doll from a village in the Tung Shao Pass. After close examination of the doll and having some of his men inspect it for clues, Shan Yu deduces that the Imperial Army is waiting for them. Ambushing General Li's army, Shan-Yu wipes out the Emperor's best troops, including General Li, and burns the village to the ground, only the aftermath of which is seen in the film. No survivors are found by Li Shang's troops. The doll that he acquired was left behind in the remains of the village (which Mulan finds and puts in front of a makeshift shrine that Shang made for his father to honor the deceased villagers). As they head for the Imperial City, the Hun army ambushes Li Shang's troops in the Tung Shao Pass (Mushu having accidentally given away their position by firing a cannon), and use flaming arrows to destroy their ammunition wagon. Shan-Yu then leads his entire army in a mounted charge to wipe out Li Shang's small battalion. Mulan, however, takes control of Li Shang's last cannon, aiming it for a nearby mountain. This maneuver triggers an avalanche that wipes out almost all of Shan-Yu's army. The soldiers depart believing that their enemies are dead, but Shan Yu rises from the snow, along with a handful of surviving warriors and Hayabusa. Mulan, having been cast out of the army, follows them.

When the Emperor is presented with Shan Yu's sword, Hayabusa snatches it and brings it up to the roof, where Shan Yu is hiding in the shadows. His men burst out of a festival dragon, grabbing the Emperor and barricading themselves inside the palace. As Shan Yu threatens the Emperor at swordpoint to bow to him, Mulan, Li Shang, Yao, Chien-Pao, and Ling infiltrate the palace, the latter three being in drag (as a disguise). Mulan, Yao, Chien-Po, and Ling defeat Shan Yu's men and Hayabusa is fried by Mushu. After securing the Emperor, Mulan finds Shan Yu about to strike Li Shang down and distracts him by revealing she was the one who wiped out his army. Pursuing her throughout the palace and onto the roof, Shan-Yu's attempt to kill Mulan backfires when Mulan initiates a plan of her own. She disarms the Hun and pins him down with his own sword while Mushu steals some fireworks and aims them at him. Mushu, Mulan, and Crik-ee then escape the roof as the Hun leader is pulled by a rocket into a tower full of other fireworks and dies in a brilliant explosion. Mulan is then awarded Shan-Yu's sword for her success at ridding China of the Huns forever.

In an earlier story treatment written by Barry Cook, Shan Yu was originally intended to return in Mulan II where he and his deceased army, now ghosts, would have started to haunt Northern China, prompting the Emperor to send Mulan and Shang there to deal with the Huns. The finale would have involved Shan Yu's ghost army, led by him personally, fighting against Mulan and her allies, including the Fa Family Ancestors.

In video games, Shan Yu appears in Kingdom Hearts II as the main antagonist and final boss in the first visit to the world Land of Dragons. Shan Yu also appears as a playable character to unlock for a limited time in the video game Disney Magic Kingdoms.

In the 2020 live-action remake, Shan Yu is portrayed by Jason Scott Lee and is renamed to Bori Khan. Here, he is a skilled warrior allied with a powerful witch who is intent on avenging his father's death by killing the Emperor. Instead of being Hun, Khan is of Rouran descent. He and his men, with the witch's help, begin attacking Imperial outposts to force the Emperor to send troops after them, including a disguised Mulan. This culminates in a large battle where the Rourans surprise Mulan's small battalion with a trebuchet, which begins to decimate their positions until Mulan tricks the Rourans into setting off an avalanche which kills many of them, but still leaves enough alive for Khan to infiltrate the Imperial capital, butcher the Emperor's guards, and lure him into a trap. Just as he is prepared to burn the Emperor alive, Mulan arrives to save him. Khan tries to shoot her with an arrow, but the witch sacrifices herself by blocking his shot. He and Mulan engage in a fierce battle, during which he manages to knock her sword into a pool of burning slag. Mulan then disarms him and the Emperor catches another arrow that Khan fires. Mulan then kicks the arrow directly into his chest, piercing his heart and killing him.

Members of the Empire

The Emperor of China
Based on the real-life emperor Qin Shi Huang, this character is shown as the wise and benevolent leader of all China. He lives in a palace (modeled, anachronistically, upon the Forbidden City) and he has a long mustache and beard. Yellow is the color that he wears in keeping with Imperial customs. In the first film, he is captured by Shan Yu and his warriors in an ambush. Mulan and Shang, in order to save him, have Yao, Ling, and Chien-Po (disguised as concubines) trick Shan Yu's men into letting their guard down so they can be dealt with. After Shan Yu is terminated, the emperor comes down the steps and, though he sternly reprimands Mulan for impersonating a soldier, he then thanks her for saving their beloved country. He is the first person to bow to her, and even offers her a position on his council, but Mulan politely declines the offer by saying that she feels she should return to her family. In gratitude, he takes off his crest and puts it on her neck and gives Shan Yu's sword to her as tokens for her efforts, the crest representing what she did for him while the sword represents what she did for China. After she leaves, he puts his hat back on and tells Li Shang to go after her, noting that "You don't meet a girl like that every dynasty." His role is a little smaller in the second film, where he instructs Mulan and Shang to take his daughters to the Mongol ruler Qui-Gong so they can be married to his sons and seal an alliance.

He was voiced by Pat Morita in the first two films and the video game Kingdom Hearts II. In the 2020 live-action remake, he is portrayed by Jet Li, and is given a slightly more expanded role as he personally confronts enemy warriors when they ambush him in his palace before being subdued and prepared for execution. Upon being saved by Mulan, he offers to let her join the Imperial guard, but she declines. He later sends Commander Tung to give Mulan a new sword to replace the one she lost fighting Bori Khan as well as offer her another opportunity to join the guard.

Chi-Fu
Chi-Fu is a member of the Emperor's council and advisor to Li Shang who refuses to allow the recruits to join the battle against the Huns and serves as a minor antagonist of the film. He is shown to harbor substantial prejudice towards women. He is most often clad in blue and places considerable importance on his clothing. He is shown to be devoted to his job and loyal to the Emperor, but is incompetent, egotistic, pompous and misogynistic, as he silences Mulan and tells Fa Zhou to teach her silence in a man's presence, orders Li Shang to execute her once her secret is revealed, despite her saving everyone, and close to the film's conclusion pompously scoffs to Shang that Mulan would never be worth anything because she is a woman. At the end of the film, as the Emperor praises Mulan for defeating Shan-Yu and saving China, he tells Chi-Fu to arrange Mulan for membership in his council. Still believing that Mulan isn't worth anything because she is a woman, Chi-Fu attempts to dissuade him from doing so by claiming that there are no more available seats in the council, but this backfires when the Emperor tells Mulan she can have Chi-Fu's job, causing him to faint. He does not appear in Mulan II, but it is shown that someone strikingly similar to Chi-Fu is a royal adviser to Lord Qin of Qigong. He was voiced by James Hong.

In the 2020 live-action remake, he is replaced by The Chancellor (portrayed by Nelson Lee). In contrast to Chi-Fu, the Chancellor has a smaller role in the film and does not interact with Mulan. He is eventually replaced by the witch Xianniang, who is able to trick the Emperor into dismissing his guards and walking into a trap by falsely claiming that Bori Khan will leave if the Emperor defeats him in single combat.

Daughters of the Emperor of China
The Emperor of China's three children, Ting-Ting, Mei, and Su, are princesses who first appear in Mulan II. He sends them into the carriage to complete the mission which is to marry the Princes of Qui Gong hiding their pretty faces with paper fans. When in the carriage, these princesses begin to panic as Mushu causes it to slide down by banging his head on the wheel.

Ting-Ting 
Ting-Ting is the eldest daughter of the Emperor of China. Her color is indigo and she is taller than both of her sisters. After Mushu has caused the carriage to slide down, she forces her younger sisters out and tries to escape, but her foot is stuck only to be saved by Ling and the carriage breaks afterward. When she hears his jokes, she thinks they are funny but she tries not to laugh, as she has an embarrassing snorting laugh. However, when the firecrackers lit by the fireflies hit him, she laughs, which causes her to snort like a pig, which Ling thought was cute. Ting-Ting appears as mature and level-headed but is actually carefree in her heart. Her speaking voice is provided by Canadian award-winning actress Sandra Oh and her singing voice is provided by Judy Kuhn. She is Crown Princess of China and one day to be Her Majesty The Empress of China.

Mei 
Mei is the middle daughter of the Emperor of China. Her color is pink and she is in between her sisters in height. She likes to get along with Yao because she thinks he is good-looking and gentle at heart. She is convinced by Mulan that her duty is to her heart and she knows that it is true. Frustrated by her older sister, she drops her fan to get in the tent and writes, "And so, my dear father, I cannot complete this mission. I have come to realize that my duty is to my heart." When Yao has won a wrestling fight, he chooses the stuffed panda bear and he shares it with her. Considered a slight damsel-in-distress, she has been kidnapped by the enemies of China when the heroes have been knocked down during their fight but saved by her friends. Mei is passionate, brave and caring. Her speaking voice is provided by Lucy Liu and her singing voice is provided by Beth Blankenship.

Su 
Su is the youngest daughter of the Emperor of China. Her color is orange and she is shorter than both of her sisters. Her favorite thing to do is gathering food from the trees and she likes to spend time with Chien-Po who likes food also. When the carriage is damaged and the fruit floats in the water, she picks them up again and she gets saved by him too. She is bright, childish and cheerful. Her speaking voice is provided by Lauren Tom and her singing voice is provided by Mandy Gonzalez.

Others

The Matchmaker
This character is an impatient and harsh woman, who obnoxiously judges potential brides. After the musical number called "Honor To Us All," she opens the doors, calls Mulan's name and takes her inside. She distastefully judges Mulan, calling her too skinny, and asks her to pour the tea as the second part of the test. Cri-Kee, who attempts to escape, ends up in the Matchmaker's cup of tea, and when Mulan tries to take the cup back, The Matchmaker falls on the floor where Cri-Kee gets into the clothing and when she gets up to tell Mulan what happened, she notices that Cri-Kee is in her clothing, causing her to crash into a stove, lighting her backside on burning embers; Mulan tries to extinguish with a paper fan, but the hot embers turn into fire, which Mulan manages to extinguish by pouring the tea on her. Blaming Mulan for the troubles, she publicly humiliates her and says that she will never bring any honor to her family being a wife. She also called Mulan a disgrace when the Matchmaker was the real disgrace. Grandmother Fa noticed her as a little stinker. The second film reveals that she is "smug and snooty," as accused by Ling, which causes her to throw a pot onto his head as she flings out the masculine trio. She is voiced by Miriam Margolyes in the first film and April Winchell in the second film.

She appears in the 2020 live-action remake and portrayed by Cheng Pei-pei.

Sha-Ron
Sha-Ron is a very excited little girl who appears in Mulan II. She first visits Fa Li and says that she wants to see Mulan, who's practicing kung-fu with a rake. Then as she goes outside and drops the buckets down, she and all of the other excited daughters of the villagers meet her and get trained on how to fight enemies as so during the "Lesson Number One" musical number. Then as General Shang arrives, she takes his helmet with more excitement and runs home. She is voiced by Jillian Henry.

Lord Qin and Prince Jeeki
Lord Qin is the priest of Qigong, first appearing in Mulan II. When Mulan is about to complete the mission, he allows her to marry his son Prince Jeeki who likes playing with the Chinese finger trap. As Lord Qin engages Mulan and his son, their wedding is interrupted and he makes Shang go away until the Golden Dragon of Unity begins to talk with Mushu's voice. He timidly allows Mulan and Shang to marry each other and then begins to play with the fingertrap Jeeki used to play with. Lord Qin is voiced by Keone Young and Prince Jeeki is voiced by Rob Paulsen.

References

Characters
Lists of Disney animated film characters
Lists of fictional Chinese people
Mulan